Myrmēkion was an ancient Greek colony in the Crimea. The settlement was founded in the eastern part of the modern city Kerch, 4 km NE of ancient Panticapaeum on
the bank of the Kerch bay near the cape Karantinny. The settlement was founded by Ionians in the first half of the 6th c. BC.

In the 5th century BC, the town specialized in winemaking and minted its own coinage. It was surrounded by towered walls, measuring some 2.5 metres thick. Myrmekion fell into the hands of the Bosporan kings in the 4th century BC and gradually dwindled into insignificance in the shadow of their capital, Panticapaeum. Regular excavations began in 1934 undertaken by an expedition led by V.F. Gaidukevich. The site was excavated by Polish archaeologists, led by Kazimierz Michałowski, in the 1950s. Between 1982 and 1994 an expedition led by Yu.A. Vinogradov was working at the site. In 1999 an archaeological expedition of the State Hermitage Museum began work at the site.

See also 
 List of ancient Greek cities

References

External links

 The official website of the Hermitage Museum archaeological expedition in Myrmekion
Myrmekion

Greek colonies in Crimea
Former populated places in Eastern Europe
Kerch
Cultural heritage monuments of federal significance in Crimea